The women's 4 x 100 metres relay event at the 1999 European Athletics U23 Championships was held in Göteborg, Sweden, at Ullevi on 1 August 1999.

Medalists

Results

Final
1 August

Participation
According to an unofficial count, 28 athletes from 7 countries participated in the event.

 (4)
 (4)
 (4)
 (4)
 (4)
 (4)
 (4)

References

4 x 100 metres relay
Relays at the European Athletics U23 Championships